Commune Football Club is a Burkinabé football club based in Ouagadougou and founded in 1977. They play their home games at the Stade du 4-Août.

Honours
Burkinabé Premier League: 1
 2007.

Coupe du Faso: 0
Burkinabé SuperCup: 1
 2007.

Performance in CAF competitions
CAF Champions League: 1 appearance
2008 – Preliminary Round

Current squad

Football clubs in Burkina Faso
Association football clubs established in 1977
Sport in Ouagadougou
1977 establishments in Upper Volta